Joseph Michael Martin (born December 3, 1958) is an American former professional baseball catcher. He holds the distinction of catching the final out of Greg Maddux's first win, a complete-game victory over Cincinnati on September 7, having initially entered the game as a pinch-runner for Jody Davis. 1986 was Martin's last professional season after nine years in minor league baseball.

External links

1958 births
Living people
Amarillo Gold Sox players
American expatriate baseball players in Canada
Baseball players from Portland, Oregon
Beaumont Golden Gators players
Chicago Cubs players
Las Vegas Stars (baseball) players
Major League Baseball catchers
Mt. Hood Saints baseball players
Pittsfield Cubs players
Redwood Pioneers players
Reno Silver Sox players
Vancouver Canadians players
Walla Walla Padres players